Qaradağlı or Karadagly may refer to:
Qaradağlı, Agdam, Azerbaijan
Qaradağlı (Qasımlı), Agdam, Azerbaijan
Qaradağlı, Agdash, Azerbaijan
Qaradağlı, Barda, Azerbaijan
Qaradağlı, Beylagan, Azerbaijan
Qaradağlı, Fuzuli, Azerbaijan
Qaradağlı, Goranboy, Azerbaijan
Qaradağlı, Khachmaz, Azerbaijan
Qaradağlı, Khojavend, Azerbaijan
Qaradağlı, Shaki, Azerbaijan
Qaradağlı, Tartar, Azerbaijan
Qaradağlı, Ujar, Azerbaijan
Yuxarı Qaradağlı, Azerbaijan

See also
Qaradağ (disambiguation)